William Frederick, Margrave of Brandenburg-Ansbach (8 January 1686 – 7 January 1723), was Margrave of the Principality of Brandenburg-Ansbach from 1703 until his death in 1723. He was the younger brother of Caroline of Ansbach and thus brother-in-law of George II of Great Britain.

Early life 
William Frederick was born in Ansbach in 1686 to John Frederick, Margrave of Brandenburg-Ansbach, and his second wife, Eleonore Erdmuthe of Saxe-Eisenach. His two surviving half-brothers, Margraves Christian Albert and George Frederick II, both died unmarried and without legitimate issue.

Personal life 
He married his first cousin, Christiane Charlotte of Württemberg-Winnental in 1709. He died in Unterreichenbach and was succeeded by his son Charles William Frederick, called "The Wild Margrave".

Ancestry 

1686 births
1723 deaths
House of Hohenzollern
Margraves of Brandenburg-Ansbach
People from Ansbach